Phytoecia valentinae is a species of beetle in the family Cerambycidae. It was described by Skrylnik in 2010. It is known from Afghanistan.

References

Phytoecia
Beetles described in 2010